Jang Yoon-jeong (born August 16, 1970) is a South Korean actress, TV Host and beauty queen who was named Miss Korea in 1987.  She represented South Korea and was the first runner-up of the Miss Universe 1988 beauty contest. Porntip Nakhirunkanok was the winner of the competition.

Miss Universe 1988
After the preliminaries, Jang Yoon-jeong was the highest-placed Asian delegate who ranked third behind the US and Dominican Republic. During the actual pageant, she placed 1st runner-up (second place) behind Thailand's Bui Simon. At the time of the Miss Universe 1988 pageant, she was a high school student studying dance. Korea has never won Miss Universe. Jang is the closest a Korean woman has come to winning since debuting in 1954. It would not be until 18 years later that a Korean woman (Honey Lee) placed as third runner-up. Miss Universe 1988 was historic: 4 out of 5 contestants were from Asian countries, only the delegate of Mexico, Amanda Olivares was from the American region.

Filmography

Web series

References

1970 births
Living people
Miss Korea winners
Miss Universe 1988 contestants